Father is a 2007 Russian drama film directed by Ivan Solovov.

Plot 
The film takes place after the war, but Alexei Ivanov is still scared. He is afraid that his children and wife have forgotten him. Also disturbing is the girl Masha, who returns to her hometown. They meet on a train that takes them home. Alexey led her home, made a promise that he would remember her and went to his relatives.

Cast 
 Aleksei Guskov as Aleksei Ivanov
 Polina Kutepova as Lyuba
 Svetlana Ivanova as Masha
 Vasiliy Prokopev as Petrusha
 Roman Madyanov as Khariton
 Nina Ruslanova as Anyuta
 Aleksandr Bashirov as Nikolai
 Yekaterina Vasilyeva as Aunt Klava
 Lyudmila Arinina as Aunt Musya
 Lidiya Velezheva as Kira

References

External links 
 

2007 films
2000s Russian-language films
Russian drama films
2007 drama films